South Dakota Highway 262 (SD 262) is a  state highway in the U.S. state of South Dakota that runs from Interstate 90 (I-90) near Alexandria to SD 42 in Bridgewater. It is maintained by the South Dakota Department of Transportation (SDDOT), and is not part of the National Highway System.

Route description
SD 262 begins at a diamond interchange with I-90 in rural Hanson County and heads south. The road almost immediately enters the city of Alexandria and takes the name of Spruce Street. In Alexandria, the route curves to the southeast and parallels a railroad. After this, SD 262 leaves the city and continues southeast. The highway crosses Pierre Creek just east of the city and passes through a series of curves which take the highway farther southeast. The road continues to parallel the railroad and intersects the southern terminus of SD 25 before traversing the community of Emery. East of Emery, SD 262 treks farther southeast through open plains and enters McCook County. Here, the highway reaches its eastern terminus at an intersection with SD 42.

SD 262 is maintained by SDDOT. In 2012, the traffic on the road was measured in average annual daily traffic. SD 262 had a high of 1,935 vehicles in Alexandria and a low of 565 vehicles between the Hanson–McCook county line and Bridgewater. The route is not a part of the National Highway System, a system of highways important to the nation's defense, economy, and mobility.

History
SD 262 follows part of the former routing of U.S. Route 16.

Major intersections

References

External links

 The Unofficial South Dakota Highways Page

262
Transportation in Hanson County, South Dakota
Transportation in McCook County, South Dakota